Clarenceville (formerly called Saint-Georges-de-Clarenceville, until September 22, 2022) is a municipality in the province of Quebec, Canada, located in the Regional County Municipality of Le Haut-Richelieu. The population as of the Canada 2016 Census was 1,103. The municipality has no drinking water system or sewers.

History

Originally part of New France the area was named Seigneurie de Foucault and settled after 1727. The land was transferred to British rule after the Treaty of Paris was signed in 1783. The area was leased to Colonel Henry Caldwell in 1774 and called Caldwell's Manor, then sold in 1842 to Joseph Frederic Allard and renamed Allard's Manor. In 1822, the name was changed to Saint-Georges-de-Clarenceville, briefly Clarenceville, after William, the Duke of Clarence (1765–1837), third son of King George III, who later became William IV.  The name was changed again in October 2022, to the Municipality of Clarenceville.

Demographics

Population

Language

Notable people
Carrie Derick (1862 – 1941), noted botanist and geneticist, was the first woman full professor at a Canadian university. She was born in Clarenceville.

See also
List of municipalities in Quebec

References

Municipalities in Quebec
Incorporated places in Le Haut-Richelieu Regional County Municipality